E. Swasey & Company was a prominent textile firm based in Portland, Maine, United States, in the late 19th and early 20th centuries. It also had a branch on Summer Street in Boston, Massachusetts.

The company was run by Eben Swasey (1843–1906), his son Fred D. Swasey (1869–1931) and George Young. It produced pottery, crockery and glassware for wholesale, while also importing pottery.

Eben Swasey began producing earthenware at his brick warehouse on Portland's Commercial Street in 1890. He had previously run Portland Earthenware Manufactory with Rufus Lamson. Swasey's products are now collectors' items.

One of the two adjacent buildings Swasey worked out of on Commercial Street is still standing an occupied; the other is now a boutique hotel and rooftop bar.

References 

1890 establishments in Maine
Textile companies of the United States
Companies based in Portland, Maine
Companies based in Boston